The Eriopygini are a small-sized tribe of moths in the Noctuinae subfamily. It was formerly placed in the Hadeninae subfamily.

Selected Genera
Anhimella
Anhypotrix
Fergusonix
Hexorthodes
Homorthodes
Hydroeciodes
Hypotrix
Lacinipolia
Lasionycta
Marilopteryx
Miodera
Neleucania
Nudorthodes
Orthodes
Protorthodes 
Psammopolia
Pseudorthodes
Tricholita
Ulolonche
Zosteropoda

References